Farah Elle (born 1994) is a Libyan-Irish singer-songwriter.

Career
Farah Elle played her first headline gig at Sin É, Dublin in 2016. She played at the 2016 KnockanStockan music festival. She collaborated with CunninLynguists on the single Oh Honey and with Bantum on Feel It Out.

In 2019, Farah Elle released a single, Play For Keeps, with MuRli, and collaborated with Bantum, Ben Bix and God Knows on the single Strongest Thing. She was one of the artists who performed as part of the Conservatory Sessions run by Pine The Pilcrow in 2019.

For the 2020 Nollaig na mBan celebrations in EPIC the Irish Emigration Museum, Elle performed alongside Tara Flynn and Chiamaka Enyi-Amadi. Her debut album, FATIMA, is due for release in 2020.

Personal life
Farah Elle's name is Farah El Neihum. She was born in Libya in 1994. Her family moved to Julianstown, County Meath, Ireland in 1996. Her mother is a consultant ophthalmologist and politician, Dr Fatima Hamroush. Elle was raised Muslim attending the Mosque in Clonskeagh, and is fluent in Arabic. She taught herself to play the keyboard as a teenager. She attended BIMM, Dublin, graduating in 2016. She has volunteered at the Direct Provision centre in Mosney, County Louth.

Discography
 Silk single (2015)
 Oh Honey single (2017) collaboration with CunninLynguists
 Feel It Out single (2017) collaboration with Bantum
 Play For Keeps single (2019) collaboration with MuRli
 Strongest Thing single and video (2019) collaboration with Bantum, Ben Bix and God Knows
 FATIMA (2020)

References

External links 
 Interview with Farah Elle on RTÉ lyric fm's Culture File
 Farah Elle on Spotify
 

Irish women singer-songwriters
English-language singers from Libya
1994 births
Living people
21st-century Libyan women singers